Ješovec pri Šmarju ( or ) is a small settlement in the Municipality of Šmarje pri Jelšah in eastern Slovenia. It is a roadside settlement on the road leading into the hills to the south of Šmarje. The area is part of the traditional region of Styria and is now included in the Savinja Statistical Region.

Name
The name of the settlement was changed from Ješovec to Ješovec pri Šmarju in 1953.

References

External links
Ješovec pri Šmarju at Geopedia

Populated places in the Municipality of Šmarje pri Jelšah